Amelie Morgan (born 31 May 2003) is a British artistic gymnast. She represented Great Britain at the 2020 Summer Olympics and won a bronze medal in the team event. She is the 2021 European Championships bronze medalist on the uneven bars. Additionally, she won the silver medal in the all-around at the 2018 Youth Olympics, as well as a silver medal on the floor exercise and a bronze on the balance beam. At the 2018 Junior European Championships where she won five medals (two silvers and three bronzes)—the most medals won by a British junior female gymnast at the European Championships.

Early life 
Morgan was born in Slough, Berkshire, in 2003.  She has a twin brother.  She joined Slough Gymnastics club when they first opened in 2010.  In 2017 she transferred to The Academy of Gymnastics. In order to juggle her education with her 35-hour a week training schedule, Amelie was homeschooled through Wolsey Hall, Oxford for her IGCSEs. She then moved to St Katherine's School to study her A levels, where she achieved an A* and two Bs.

Gymnastics career

2008–2010
Amelie started her gymnastics journey at Chiltern Gymnastics, based in Iver and later moved to Beaconsfield.

2015–16 
Morgan began her gymnastics career in 2015, where she competed at the English Championships and finished second at the espoir level.  In 2016 Morgan was selected to compete at the School Games, where she placed third in the all-around, on balance beam, and on floor exercise.  Later that year she competed at the Olympic Hopes Cup where she placed second in the all-around behind Ana Padurariu of Canada.

2017 
Morgan finished second at the British Championships behind Taeja James.  In late June Morgan announced that she had verbally committed to attend the University of California, Berkeley on a gymnastics scholarship.  In July Morgan competed at the European Youth Olympic Festival where she won bronze on balance beam behind Ksenia Klimenko of Russia and Asia D'Amato of Italy.  In November Morgan competed at the Olympic Hopes Cup where she won gold in the all-around and on floor exercise and won silver on vault.  Morgan ended 2017 competed at the Top Gym Tournament where she placed fifth in the all-around, fourth on beam, but won gold on floor exercise.

2018 
Morgan won gold in the all-around at both the English Championships and the British Championships.  She was selected to represent Great Britain at the 2018 European Championships.  While there Morgan won a record 5 medals – silver in the all-around and on balance beam, both behind Giorgia Villa of Italy, and bronze in the team final, vault (behind Asia D'Amato of Italy and Villa), and floor exercise (behind Ioana Stanciulescu of Romania and Villa).  Later in the year Morgan was selected to represent Great Britain at the 2018 Youth Olympic Games.  While there she won silver in the all-around and on floor exercise, once again behind Villa, and won bronze on balance beam behind Tang Xijing of China and Klimenko  .

Senior

2019
Morgan turned senior in 2019 and made her debut at the English Championships where she won gold in the all-around, finishing 1.75 points ahead of second place Kelly Simm.  She was later selected to compete at the 2019 European Championships alongside Ellie Downie, Alice Kinsella, and Claudia Fragapane. Morgan competed at the British Championships and won bronze in the all-around, on uneven bars, and on balance beam.  She placed fourth on floor exercise.  At the European Championships Morgan finished fifth in the all-around qualification but did not advance to the final due to teammates Kinsella and Downie scoring higher.  Morgan was also a reserve for the bars and beam final. Just after the European Championships Morgan sustained an injury.  She healed in time for the 2019 World Championships in Stuttgart as travelling reserve but she re-injured herself and Kelly Simm took her place. In November Morgan made her international comeback at the Cottbus World Cup in Germany.  She qualified to the uneven bars final where she scored 13.766 and placed seventh.

2020 
In January it was announced that Morgan would represent Great Britain at the American Cup, taking place on March 7. However, due to injury she was replaced by Jennifer Gadirova.

2021
In April Morgan was selected to represent Great Britain at the European Championships alongside Jessica Gadirova, Jennifer Gadirova (later replaced by Phoebe Jakubczyk), and Alice Kinsella.  While there she qualified to the all-around final in 5th place and the uneven bars, and balance beam event finals in 7th and 3rd place respectively.  During the all-around final Morgan finished in fourth place behind Russians Viktoria Listunova and Angelina Melnikova and teammate Gadirova. She won the bronze in the uneven bars final behind Melnikova and Vladislava Urazova. In the beam final, Morgan placed 4th due to a mistake on her wolf turn.

On 7 June, Morgan was selected to represent Great Britain at the 2020 Summer Olympics alongside Jennifer Gadirova, Jessica Gadirova, and Alice Kinsella.

At the Olympic Games Morgan did not qualify for any individual event finals; however Great Britain qualified for the team final. During the team final Morgan competed on uneven bars and balance beam, helping Great Britain win the bronze medal, their first Olympic team medal in 93 years.

NCAA

2021–2022 season 
In July Morgan announced plans to switch NCAA commitments from the University of California, Berkeley to the University of Utah.  In August she moved to Salt Lake City, Utah to join the University of Utah gymnastics team for the 2021–2022 season as a part of their freshman class alongside Olympic silver medallist Grace McCallum, Kara Eaker, and Sage Thompson.

Morgan made her NCAA debut at the Best of Utah meet, against BYU, Southern Utah, and Utah State, where she competed on uneven bars and balance beam, where she scored a 9.825 and a 9.875 respectively, to help Utah win. She was subsequently named as the Pac-12 Freshman of the week.

Competitive history

Media appearances 
Morgan first appeared in the CBBC documentary series Gym Stars in 2018 and became one of its leading contributors alongside Phoebe Jakubczyk. She returned for Series 2, which began airing in April 2019 and Series 3 which began airing in March 2020

Selected competitive skills

References

External links 

 
 
 
 

2003 births
Living people
British female artistic gymnasts
Gymnasts at the 2018 Summer Youth Olympics
Gymnasts at the 2020 Summer Olympics
Olympic gymnasts of Great Britain
Olympic medalists in gymnastics
Olympic bronze medallists for Great Britain
Olympic athletes of Great Britain
Medalists at the 2020 Summer Olympics
Utah Red Rocks gymnasts
Twin sportspeople